The following lists events that happened in 1945 in Iceland.

Incumbents
President – Sveinn Björnsson 
Prime Minister – Ólafur Thors

 
1940s in Iceland
Iceland
Iceland
Years of the 20th century in Iceland